Robert de Brus, the Noble (ca. 1195–1245) was 4th Lord of Annandale.

He was the son of William de Brus, 3rd Lord of Annandale and Christina mac Uchtred

Robert had the same name as both his uncle and his grandfather.  His uncle died before becoming Lord of Annandale, and therefore his father, William, inherited the title,  becoming 3rd Lord of Annandale.  Robert married ca. 1219 Isobel of Huntingdon, the second daughter of David of Scotland, 8th Earl of Huntingdon, by which marriage he acquired the manors of Writtle and Hatfield Broadoak, Essex in England. They had 2 sons and a daughter:

 Robert de Brus, 5th Lord of Annandale, married firstly Isabella de Clare, with issue; married secondly Christina de Ireby, without issue.
 Bernard de Brus of Exton, married firstly Alice de Beauchamp, daughter of William de Beauchamp of Elmley, and married secondly Constance de Merston, widow of John de Morteyn; was the father of Sir Bernard de Brus II.
 Beatrice de Brus, married Hugo de Neville.

Robert died in 1232, and was survived by his wife Isabella. He was buried in the family mausoleum Gisborough Priory

Notes

References
 Duncan, A. A. M., ‘Brus , Robert (II) de, lord of Annandale (d. 1194?)’, in Oxford Dictionary of National Biography, Oxford University Press, 2004 accessed 14 Nov 2006

13th-century deaths
Robert
Scoto-Normans
Burials at Gisborough Priory
Year of birth uncertain
Lords of Annandale